Spelling the Dream is a 2020 documentary film directed by Sam Rega and written by Sam Rega and Chris Weller. The premise of the film revolves around competitive spelling bees, which have been dominated by Indian-Americans in recent times. The film follows the life of four kids: Akash Vukoti, Tejas Muthusamy, Ashrita Gandhari and Shourav Dasari. The film also features interviews with Jacques Bailly, Kevin Negandhi, Sanjay Gupta, Fareed Zakaria, Hari Kondabolu, Valerie Browning, Srinivas Ayyagari, and Pawan Dhingra.

Release 
Spelling the Dream was released worldwide on June 3, 2020, on Netflix.

Reception 
The film picked up positive reviews from The New York Times, The Wall Street Journal, The Guardian, The Indian Express, The Hindu, The Adelaide Review, and the Singaporean version of Harper's Bazaar.

References

External links
 
 

Netflix original documentary films
2020 documentary films
2020 films
Indian-American culture
Films about spelling competitions
2020s English-language films